Arlotte Douglas Tushingham (1914 – February 27, 2002) was a Canadian archaeologist most noted for his excavations of Jericho with Kathleen Kenyon.

Selected works

References

External links
 https://web.archive.org/web/20160304111602/http://www.wlu.ca/press/Journals/sr/issues/31_3-4/tushingham.pdf

1914 births
2002 deaths
Canadian archaeologists
20th-century archaeologists